Alfred Edward Kaiser (August 3, 1886 – April 11, 1969) was a Major League Baseball outfielder.

External links

1886 births
1969 deaths
Major League Baseball outfielders
Chicago Cubs players
Boston Braves players
Boston Rustlers players
Indianapolis Hoosiers players
Dayton Veterans players
Paris Bourbonites players
Lexington Colts players
Indianapolis Indians players
Indianapolis Hoosiers (minor league) players
Baseball players from Cincinnati